This is a list of Danish television related events from 1995.

Events
25 March - Aud Wilken is selected to represent Denmark at the 1995 Eurovision Song Contest with her song "Fra Mols til Skagen". She is selected to be the twenty-seventh Danish Eurovision entry during Dansk Melodi Grand Prix held at the DR Studios in Copenhagen.
Unknown - Debut of Stjerneskud, a series hosted by Anders Frandsen in which members of the public impersonate their favourite singers.
Unknown - The first season of Stjerneskud was won by Gry Trampedach performing as Sanne Salomonsen.

Debuts
Unknown - Stjerneskud (1995-1996)

Television shows

Ending this year

Births

Deaths

See also
1995 in Denmark